David Meriwether may refer to:
 David Meriwether (Georgia politician) (1755–1822), Revolutionary War soldier and Representative from Georgia
 David Meriwether (Kentucky politician) (1800–1893), Senator from Kentucky and also Governor of Territorial New Mexico